Jean Robert Georges Marie Dary (6 December 1889 – 18 April 1945) was a French ice hockey player. He competed in the men's tournament at the 1920 Summer Olympics.

References

External links
 

1889 births
1945 deaths
Ice hockey people from Paris
Ice hockey players at the 1920 Summer Olympics
Olympic ice hockey players of France